Andreea Părăluță (born 27 November 1994) is a Romanian professional footballer who plays as a goalkeeper for Levante and the Romania women's national team.

Honours

Club
ASA Târgu Mureș
 Cupa României (1): 2015–16

Atletico Madrid
Primera División (2): 2016–17, 2017–18

Individual 
 AFAN Best Football Player in Romania: 2015

References

External links
 Profile at La Liga 

1994 births
Living people
Romanian women's footballers
Romania women's international footballers
People from Dâmbovița County
Women's association football goalkeepers
Expatriate women's footballers in Spain
Romanian expatriate sportspeople in Spain
Primera División (women) players
Atlético Madrid Femenino players
Levante UD Femenino players